In dieser Stadt (English: In This Town) is the fourth studio album by Austrian recording artist Christina Stürmer. It was released on April 10, 2009, almost exactly a year after the release of her acoustic album, laut-Los (2008). The lead single, "Ist mir egal".

Track listing

Charts

Weekly charts

Year-end charts

References

External links 
 

2009 albums
Christina Stürmer albums
German-language albums